19-Norandrosterone, also known as 5α-estran-3α-ol-17-one, is a metabolite of nandrolone (19-nortestosterone) and bolandione (19-norandrostenedione) that is formed by 5α-reductase. It is on the list of substances prohibited by the World Anti-Doping Agency since it is a detectable metabolite of nandrolone, an anabolic-androgenic steroid (AAS). Consumption of androstendione products contaminated with traces of bolandione may also result in testing positive for nandrolone.

Traces of 19-norandrosterone may be naturally present in human urine. An experiment conducted on athletes showed that after a prolonged intense effort, the 19-norandrosterone concentration can be increased by a factor varying between 2 and 4, but another study failed to replicate the result. Concentration also increases in the urine of female athletes during menstruation. The consumption of edible parts of a non-castrated pig, containing 19-nortestosterone, has been shown to result in the excretion of 19-norandrosterone in the following hours, so athletes should prudently avoid meals composed of pig offal in the hours preceding doping tests. Consumption of boar meat, liver, kidneys and heart also increased 19-norandrosterone output.

See also
 Androsterone
 19-Noretiocholanolone
 5α-Dihydronandrolone
 5α-Dihydronorethisterone

References

External links
 Testing for 19-norandrosterone
 Doping Control Procedures

5α-Reduced steroid metabolites
Secondary alcohols
Androgens and anabolic steroids
Estranes
Human drug metabolites
Ketones
World Anti-Doping Agency prohibited substances